Chedworth is a village and civil parish in Gloucestershire, southwest England, in the Cotswolds. It is known as the location of Chedworth Roman Villa, administered since 1924 by the National Trust.

Chedworth Stream rises close to the village and flows east for about 3 km in a narrow valley before joining the River Coln at the point where it is crossed by the ancient Fosse Way.

Roman villa

The villa is a 1,700-year-old farmstead between Yanworth and Withington, about 3 miles or 5.5 km from Chedworth village by road, although it sits to the south of the River Coln and so is within Chedworth parish. It is connected with Chedworth village by two alternative long-distance footpaths, the Macmillan Way and the Monarch's Way, both about 1 mile in walking distance. The villa was discovered by accident in 1864. It is the remains of one of the largest Romano-British villas in England, featuring several mosaics, two bathhouses, hypocausts (underfloor heating), a water-shrine and a latrine. The water shrine became very special as the Romans used it to worship the goddess of the natural spring that gives it an endless amount of water. New facilities opened in 2014.

History
The parish church of St Andrew is of 12th century Norman origin, but was much rebuilt in the second half of the 15th century. The south doorway has been described as "a most notable piece of rich Perpendicular work" and the south range of five Perpendicular windows has also been admired: "The interior is very charming because these great Perpendicular windows are like a wall of clear tinted glass which reflects the light onto the plastered walls."

The eminent  medieval judge and cleric Thomas de Chaddesworth, or de Chedworth, Dean of St Patrick's Cathedral, Dublin,  and an unsuccessful candidate to be Archbishop of Dublin, was born here in about 1230, and took his surname from the village. He died in Ireland at a great age in 1311.

Between 1892 and 1961 the village had a railway station on the Midland and South Western Junction Railway.

Governance
Until the 2015 district council elections, there was an electoral ward in the same name. This ward started in the south at Chedworth and stretched north to end at Dowdeswell. The total ward population taken at the 2011 census was 1,705.

Chedworth Parish Council was formed under the Local Government Act of 1894. Its first preliminary meeting was held on 4 December 1894, and the first full meeting was held on 3 January 1895, chaired by the Rev. Sackett Hope. Fifteen candidates stood for election to the seven seats available. Subsequently, in 1904 again 15 candidates stood for the seven seats, and none of the previous incumbents was re-elected. The last contested Chedworth Parish Council election was in 2015, when 10 candidates stood for the seven available seats. The council holds monthly meetings on the second Monday of each month at 7.30 at the Village Hall. The Parish Council has its own website which gives contact details.

Amenities
The Seven Tuns Inn is close to the church at the far western, "upper" end of the village. The "tuns" are variously chimneys or barrels, both of which have featured on the pub sign at different times. It is a Grade II listed building.  Chedworth had a post office and village store for over 120 years before the final postmistress, Miss Lait, closed her Fields Road establishment in 1993, leaving Chedworth with no retail outlets. Following a vigorous campaign by local residents, Chedworth Farm Shop opened in 2006, using former dairy buildings at Denfurlong Farm on Fields Road. However, the farm shop closed permanently on 27 February 2021.

See also 
 List of rail trails

References

External links 

 Photos of Chedworth Roman villa and surrounding area on geograph
 Photos of Chedworth and surrounding area on geograph
 Gloucestershire Wildlife Trust

Holy wells in England
Villages in Gloucestershire
Cotswold District